Qaleh-ye Bahador (also Romanized as Qal‘eh-ye Bahādor) is a village in Teshkan Rural District, Chegeni District, Dowreh County, Lorestan Province, Iran. At the 2006 census, its population was 230, in 47 families.

References 

Towns and villages in Dowreh County